The 2016 season was Western New York Flash's ninth season, the fourth in which they competed in the National Women's Soccer League, the top division of women's soccer in the United States. The season ended with the Flash's first finals appearance since the 2013 NWSL season and the franchise's first NWSL Championship victory. It was also the final season of the NWSL franchise's existence in Rochester, New York, or as the Western New York Flash, after being purchased by the North Carolina FC organization, moved to Cary, North Carolina, and rebranded as the North Carolina Courage in January 2017. It was replaced in March 2017 by a new Buffalo-based Western New York Flash team in United Women's Soccer.

First-team squad

Match results

Pre-season
The Flash announced their preseason schedule on March 11, 2016.

Regular season

Postseason playoff

Standings

Results summary

Results by round

Squad statistics
Source: NWSL

Squad statistics are of regular season only

References

External links

See also
 2016 National Women's Soccer League season

Western New York Flash seasons
Western New York Flash
Western New York Flash
Western New York Flash